The non-marine molluscs of Morocco are a part of the molluscan fauna of Morocco (Wildlife of Morocco).

A number of species of non-marine molluscs are found in the wild in Morocco.

Freshwater gastropods 

Thiaridae
 Melanoides tuberculata (Müller, 1774)

Hydrobiidae
 Aghbalia aghbalensis Glöer, Mabrouki & Taybi, 2020
 Ainiella zahredini Taybi, Glöer & Mabrouki, 2022
 Atebbania bernasconi Ghamizi, Bodon, Boulal & Giusti, 1999
 Belgrandia wiwanensis Ghamizi (1998)
 Ecrobia vitrea (Risso, 1826)
 Fessia aouintii Glöer, Mabrouki & Taybi, 2020
 Giustia bodoni Ghamizi, 1998
 Giustia costata Ghamizi, 1998
 Giustia gofasi Ghamizi, 1998
 Giustia janai Ghamizi, 1998
 Giustia mellalensis Ghamizi, 1998
 Giustia midarensis Ghamizi, 1998
 Giustia saidai Ghamizi, 1998
 Heideella andreae Backhyus & Boeters, 1974
 Heideella knidirii Ghamizi, 1998
 Heideella makhfamensis Bodon, Ghamizi & Giusti, 1999
 Heideella salahi Ghamizi (1998)
 Horatia aghbalensis Ghamizi (1998)
 Horatia haasei Ghamizi (1998)
 Hydrobia gracilis Morelet, 1880
 Hydrobia recta (Mousson, 1874)
 Idrisiella bourkaizensis Mabrouki, Glöer & Taybi, 2022
 Ifrania zerroukansis Glöer, Mabrouki & Taybi, 2020
 Islamia karawiyiensis Glöer, Mabrouki & Taybi, 2021 - endemic to Morocco
 Islamia tifertiensis Glöer, Mabrouki & Taybi, 2020
 Mercuria atlasica Glöer, Mabrouki & Taybi, 2021 - endemic to Morocco
 Mercuria bakeri Glöer, Boeters & Walther, 2015 - endemic to Morocco
 Mercuria confusa (Frauenfeld, 1838)
 Mercuria gauthieri Glöer, Bouzid & Boeters, 2010
 Mercuria halouii Taybi, Glöer & Mabrouki, 2022
 Mercuria midarensis Boulaassafer, Ghamizi & Delicado, 2018 - endemic to Morocco
 Mercuria nadorensis Taybi, Glöer & Mabrouki, 2022
 Mercuria targouasensis Glöer, Boeters & Walther, 2015 - endemic to Morocco
 Mercuria tensiftensis Boulaassafer, Ghamizi & Delicado, 2018 - endemic to Morocco
 Mercuria tingitana Glöer, Boeters & Walther, 2015 - endemic to Morocco
 Pikasia smenensis Taybi, Glöer & Mabrouki, 2021
 Pseudamnicola berrahoui Taybi, Glöer & Mabrouki, 2022
 Pseudamnicola bouhaddiouii Taybi, Glöer & Mabrouki, 2022
 Pseudamnicola dupotetiana (Forbes, 1838)
 Pseudamnicola leprevieri (Pallary, 1926)
 Pseudamnicola luteola (Küster, 1852)
 Pseudamnicola pallaryi Ghamizi, Vala & Bouka, 1997
 Pseudamnicola skourensis Taybi, Glöer & Mabrouki, 2022
 Pseudamnicola tafoughaltensis Taybi, Glöer & Mabrouki, 2022
 Rifia yacoubii Ghamizi, 2020

Moitessieriidae 
 Iglica seyadi Backhyus & Boeters, 1974
 Iglica soussensis Ghamizi & Boulal, 2017

Tateidae
 Potamopyrgus antipodarum (J.E. Gray, 1843)

Melanopsidae
 Melanopsis cariosa (Linné, 1767)
 Melanopsis praemorsa (Linnaeus, 1758)
 Melanopsis scalaris (Gassies, 1856)

Planorbidae
 Bulinus truncatus (Audouin, 1827)
 Gyraulus marocana Youness, Glöer & Taybi, 2022

Lymnaeidae
 Galba truncatula (O. F. Müller, 1774)
 Lymnaea peregra (Müller, 1774)
 Lymnaea stagnalis (Linnaeus, 1758)
 Radix labiata (Rossmässler, 1835)
 Stagnicola palustris (Müller, 1774)

Physidae
 Physella acuta (Draparnaud, 1805)

Planorbidae
 Ancylus fluviatilis (Müller, 1774)
 Planorbarius metidjensis (Forbes, 1838)

 Land gastropods 
Land gastropods in Morocco include:

Milacidae
 Milax gagates (Draparnaud, 1801)

Parmacellidae
 Parmacella deshayesi Moquin-Tandon, 1848

Sphincterochilidae
 Sphincterochila baetica (Rossmässler, 1854)

Hygromiidae
 Helicopsis conopsis Morelet, 1876 - endemic

Helicidae
 Theba pisana (O. F. Müller, 1774)

Freshwater bivalves

Unionidae
 Potomida littoralis (Cuvier, 1798)
 Unio durieui'' (Deshayes, 1874)

See also
Lists of molluscs of surrounding countries:
 List of non-marine molluscs of Spain
 List of non-marine molluscs of Algeria
 List of non-marine molluscs of Mauritania
 List of non-marine molluscs of Western Sahara, Wildlife of Western Sahara
 List of non-marine molluscs of Portugal
 List of non-marine molluscs of the Canary Islands

References

Molluscs, Non marine

Molluscs
Morocco
Morocco